Nishihira (written: 西平) is a Japanese surname. Notable people with the surname include:

, Japanese actress
, Okinawan karateka

See also
Nishihara

Japanese-language surnames